K. Dasan (born 1 December 1952) is a member of the 13th Kerala Legislative Assembly. He belongs to the Communist Party of India (Marxist) party and represents Koyilandy constituency.

Political life
Started political life as Secretary of C.P.I.(M) Quilandy Constituency Committee. He was the Taluk Secretary of  Chethu Thozhilali Union (C.I.T.U.), Handloom Workers Union (C.I.T.U). He was the  member of Panchayat Board, Quilandy (1978).He was the Chairman of BDC (1989) and Quilandy Municipality (1995-2005). Now, Member of C.P.I.(M) District Committee, Kozhikode; All India General Council, C.I.T.U.; State Committee, C.I.T.U.; Vice President, Kozhikode District Committee, C.I.T.U.; President, Matsya Thozhilali Federation (C.I.T.U.), Kozhikode; Secretary, Chethu Thozhilali Union (C.I.T.U.), Quilandy Taluk; Area Secretary, C.I.T.U., Quilandy.

Personal life
Son of Shri Kunhiraman and Smt. Kalliani, born at Viyyur, Quilandy Taluk, on 1st December 1952. He studied till S.S.L.C. He was married to Smt. E. Sulochana , the couple have a son and a daughter.

References

1952 births
Communist Party of India (Marxist) politicians from Kerala
Living people
Kerala MLAs 2016–2021
Kerala MLAs 2011–2016